Donald Penfield Nichols (October 17, 1901 – March 14, 1978) was a college football player and attorney from Pomona, California.

Early years
Nichols was born in California on October 17, 1901 to Allen P. Nichols and Elizabeth Adgate.

University of California, Berkeley
Nichols attended Pomona high school. He was a prominent running back for Andy Smith's California Golden Bears. He was twice selected All-Pacific Coast, and made Billy Evans's "National Honor Roll" in 1922. Nichols was the star of the 45–7 victory over Washington. He was elected captain of the 1923 team as well as the representative of his class to the executive board. Nichols was one of the players who left with coach Smith on a scouting trip to Stanford in Palo Alto as the Bears were tied by Nevada.

References

California Golden Bears football players
American football halfbacks
1901 births
1978 deaths
Sportspeople from Pomona, California
American football fullbacks
Players of American football from California
20th-century American lawyers
All-American college football players